Design Workshop is an international landscape architecture, land planning, urban design and strategic services firm that began in 1969. The firm was named ASLA's Firm of the Year in 2008 for its work in new communities, urban centers, resorts, public parks, golf courses and residences.

The firm has offices in the United States in Asheville, Aspen, Austin, Chicago, Denver, Houston, Lake Tahoe and Los Angeles, as well as international offices in Beijing and Dubai.

Design Worksop has collaborated with Utah State University to be offer a collection of its project records for use by students, landscape architects, environmental planners and anyone studying the history and development of the 20th-Century West.

History
Design Workshop was founded in 1969 by Don Ensign and Joe A. Porter - friends and college professors. They assisted private-sector clients, often engaging colleagues and students in a collaborative process they labeled “design workshops.”

Their early assignments started their small professional practice. A few years later the founders relocated the firm to Aspen and became known for solving the complex problems found in fragile ecosystems and the development challenges of the western landscape.

Over 40 years later, Design Workshop's services have expanded to include master plans for counties, planned communities, urban centers and resorts as well as design for public parks, residences and roadways.

Notable projects
Some of Design Workshop's projects include:
 Aspen Downtown Enhancement and Pedestrian Plan - Aspen, Colorado
 Daybreak Community - South Jordan, Utah
 The Glacier Club at Tamarron - Durango, Colorado
 Kananaskis Village - Alberta, Canada
 Kierland Commons - Phoenix, Arizona
 Rancho Viejo - Santa Fe, New Mexico
 Riverfront Park  - Denver, Colorado
 Whistler Blackcomb - Whistler, British Columbia, Canada
 Whistler Comprehensive Sustainability Plan - Whistler, British Columbia

Sources

External links
 Design Workshop Landscape Architecture Archive Digital Collection: Utah State University

Design companies of the United States
Design companies established in 1969
American companies established in 1969